Robert Cameron Bruce Jr. (October 6, 1914 – August 24, 2003) was an American voice actor and the son of Robert Cameron Bruce (1887–1948) who was a cinematographer and documentary producer. He was the narrator for a number of Warner Bros. cartoons in the 1930s and 1940s. The Looney Tunes and Merrie Melodies series' had occasional entries which were driven not by one of their stable of stars such as Bugs Bunny or Daffy Duck, but by individual short sketches, usually filled with sight gags and word-play. Later he was a writer and producer of industrial motion pictures based in Minnesota.

Career
Bruce spent two and a half years doing nine shows a week on WMCA and he later moved to Hollywood where he landed a job on KFWB, the Warner Bros. radio station, and was one of the four regulars on the show alongside Arthur Q. Bryan, Jack Lescoulie, and Alan Ladd. Bruce did four or five shows a week at $5 a show and got a job providing voice work for Leon Schlesinger's cartoon studio as the building was in the same place where Bruce performed his radio work. Bruce was used as a narrator in most of the cartoons that were directed by Tex Avery, Bob Clampett, and Chuck Jones. Besides providing narration, Bruce was also heard as several characters in a few cartoons including "Dangerous Dan McFoo" where he voiced a dog with a cigarette and a referee. Bruce would record his dialogue on an empty stage with the director, writer and engineer in a booth up near the ceiling explaining the cartoon to him and would record his lines afterwards. In addition for working for Warner Bros. Cartoons, Bruce also provided voice work for Walter Lantz's cartoon studio and for George Pal's Puppetoons series. From 1950 to 1951, Bruce was an actor on the TV show NBC Comics where he played characters on two of the shows "Kid Champion" and "Space Barton". Later, he had a company based in Minnesota known as Robert C. Bruce Productions where he produced and wrote industrial films and commercials. He was a former president of Minnesota Heart Association, was president of American Federation of Radio and Television Artists, and was a member of Pioneers of Radio. In the late sixties, he retired to a home in South Carolina.

Animation voiceover work
Rover's Rival (1937) as Rover
The Daffy Doc (1938) as Daffy's Conscience
Dangerous Dan McFoo (1939) as Narrator/Referee/Dog with Cigarette
Detouring America (1939) as Narrator
Land of the Midnight Fun (1939) as Narrator
Fresh Fish (1939) as Narrator
The Film Fan (1939) as Coming Attractions Narrator
Africa Squeaks (1940) as Narrator
Pilgrim Porky (1940) as Narrator
The Bear's Tale (1940) as Narrator
The Hardship of Miles Standish (1940) as Radio Announcer/Grandpa
A Gander at Mother Goose (1940) as Narrator
The Chewin' Bruin (1940) as Old Timer
Ceiling Hero (1940) as Narrator
Wacky Wildlife (1940) as Narrator
Porky's Snooze Reel (1941) as Narrator
Fair Today (1941) as Narrator
Farm Frolics (1941) as Narrator
Salt Water Daffy (1941) as Narrator
Meet John Doughboy (1941) as Citizen Sugar Cane & Narrator
We, the Animals Squeak! (1941) as Narrator
Aviation Vacation (1941) as Narrator
The Bug Parade (1941) as Narrator
Who's Who in the Zoo (1942) as Narrator
Crazy Cruise (1942) as Narrator
Hobby Horse-Laffs (1942) as Narrator
Fox Pop (1942) as Radio Announcer

The 500 Hats of Bartholomew Cubbins (1943) as Narrator
Fin'n Catty (1943) as Narrator (beginning and ending only)
What's Cookin' Doc? (1944) as Opening Narrator
Russian Rhapsody (1944) as Radio Announcer
Brother Brat (1944) as Narrator
Buckaroo Bugs (1944) as Narrator and Villagers
Plane Daffy (1944) as Narrator
The Weakly Reporter (1944) as Narrator
Wagon Heels (1945) as Narrator
Nasty Quacks (1945) as Narrator
Book Revue (1946) as Henry VIII
Bacall to Arms (1946) as Narrator
Of Thee I Sting (1946) as Narrator
Fair and Worm-er (1946) as Narrator
Hobo Bobo (1947) as Narrator and New Yorkers
Crowing Pains (1947) as Barnyard Dawg
Swallow the Leader (1949) as Narrator
Orange Blossoms for Violet (1952) as Narrator
Punch Trunk (1953) as Narrator/Psychiatrist/Radio Announcer
Feline Frame-Up (1954) as Filbert
Gone Batty (1955) as Narrator
The Hole Idea (1955) as Narrator
Bugs' Bonnets (1956) as Opening Narrator
Dog Tales (1958) as Narrator
Bonanza Bunny (1959) as Narrator

List of Private Snafu shorts voiced by Robert C. Bruce
Booby Traps (1944)
Outpost (1944)
Target Snafu (1944)
A Few Quick Facts: Fear (1945)
It's Murder, She Says... (1945)
Private Snafu Presents Seaman Tarfu in the Navy (1946)

Legacy
Bruce never got a screen credit, but his voice was recognizable, and he is mentioned in the commentary for the Looney Tunes Golden Collection.

He introduces the cartoon What's Cookin' Doc? (1944) which begins with a filmed segment about Oscar night, and transitions into a Bugs Bunny cartoon.

In the last scene of the cartoon Punch Trunk (1953), Bruce is "Mr. Pratt", a TV station announcer who introduces the audience to a distinguished science lecturer (voiced by Mel Blanc) named "Dr. Robert Bruce Cameron"—a play on Bruce's own name.

In addition to the "Crazy Cruise" types of cartoons, he provides the voice of the narrator for the 1956 cartoon Bugs' Bonnets, an animated exposition on the "well-known psychological fact that people's behavior is strongly affected by the way they dress".

See also
 Looney Tunes and Merrie Melodies filmography
 Looney Tunes and Merrie Melodies filmography (1929–39)
 Looney Tunes and Merrie Melodies filmography (1940–49)
 Looney Tunes and Merrie Melodies filmography (1950–59)
 Looney Tunes and Merrie Melodies filmography (1960–69)
 Looney Tunes and Merrie Melodies filmography (1970–present and miscellaneous)
 Looney Tunes Golden Collection

References

External links

Reference to an interview with Robert C. Bruce
Find A Grave entry

1914 births
2003 deaths
American male voice actors
American male radio actors
People from Klickitat County, Washington
Radio and television announcers
Warner Bros. Cartoons voice actors